Originally scheduled to run on 17 February, the downhill portion of the Women's combined was postponed due to high winds. The slalom was held on 17 February and the downhill portion was on Saturday, 18 February. Janica Kostelić was both defending World and Olympic champion, and she led the aggregate World Cup standings. Janica also won the only combined race leading into the championships in St. Moritz, Switzerland and she also won all combined races held in World Cup since the last Olympic games.

Results
The results of the women's combined event in Alpine skiing at the 2006 Winter Olympics.

References

External links
Official Olympic Report

Combined